Matias is a form of the given name Matthew. In German-speaking Europe it is most often written as Matthias. Matías is the Spanish version of Matthias. It appears in this form in Norway, Sweden, Denmark and Finland. Alternate spellings are: Mathias, Mattias, Mattis, Mats and Matti. Matias was the same day by the Finnish-Swedish name day calendar until 1989, when it was replaced by Mattias forms and Mats. In Finland, by the end of 2009 the name has been given to about 73,160 people. In the form of Mattias to 3,683 people, in the form of Matthias to little more than 440, and in the form of Mathias a little less than 3,000.

Given name
Matias Aguayo (born 1973), German-Chilean record producer
Matias Aires (1705-1763), Portuguese philosopher
Matias Albarracin (born 1979), Argentine Olympic athlete
Matias de Arteaga (1633-1704), Spanish painter
Matias Brain (born 1974), Chilean Olympic athlete
Matias del Campo, Chilean-Austrian architect
Matias Caseras (born 1992), Uruguayan football player
Matias Gabriel Ceballos (born 1984), Argentinean footballer
Matias Collins (born 1970), American sailor
Matias Concha (born 1980), Swedish footballer
Matias Damásio (born 1982), Angolan musician
Matias Defensor Jr. (born 1943), Filipino politician
Matias Faldbakken (born 1973), Norwegian artist
Matias Ferreira (born 1997), Portuguese footballer
Matias Haaranen (born 1996), Finnish ice hockey defenceman
Matias Habtemichael (born 1950), Ethiopian middle-distance runner
Matias Hänninen (born 1991), Finnish footballer
Matias Koski (born 1994), Finnish swimmer
Matias Köykkä (born 1994), Finnish racing driver
Matias Kupiainen (born 1983), Finnish guitarist
Matias Laine (born 1990), Finnish racing driver
Matias Lassen (born 1996), Danish ice hockey defenceman
Matias Loppi (born 1980), Finnish ice hockey forward
Matias Mäkynen (born 1990), Finnish politician
Matias Malmberg (born 2000), Danish track cyclist
Matias Maccelli (born 2000), Finnish ice hockey forward
Matias Mantilla (born 1981), Argentine footballer
Matias Marttinen (born 1990), Finnish politician
Matias Masucci, Italian writer
Matias Montinho (born 1990), Angolan sailor
Matias Møvik (born 1991), Norwegian footballer
Matias Myttynen (born 1990), Finnish ice hockey forward
Matias Niuta (born 2001), Finnish footballer
Matias Ojala (born 1995), Finnish footballer
Matias Paterlini (born 1977), Argentine cricketer
Matias Perez (died 1856), Portuguese-Cuban resident 
Matias Pulli (born 1995), Finnish ice hockey defenceman
Matias Putkonen (born 1822), Finnish Lutheran priest
Matias Ranillo Sr. (1898-1947), Filipino legislator
Matias Rueda (born 1988), Argentine boxer
Matias Shikondomboro, Namibian Lutheran pastor
Matias Skard (1846-1927), Norwegian translator
Matias Sointu (born 1990), Finnish ice hockey forward
Matias Spektor (born 1977), Argentine author
Matias Strandvall (born 1985), Finnish cross country skier
Matias Tellez (born 1989), Norwegian singer-songwriter
Matias Tuomi (born 1985), Finnish squash player
Matias Varela (born 1980), Swedish actor
Matias Viazzo (born 1983), Argentine rugby union player
Matias Zaldarriaga (born 1971), Argentinean cosmologist
Kimi-Matias Räikkönen (born 1979), Finnish racing driver

Surname
Aura Matias, Filipino engineer
Manuel Matias (born 1962), Portuguese long-distance runner
Manuel Matias (born 1964), Portuguese footballer

See also
 Mathias (disambiguation)
 Matthias
 Mattias

Scandinavian masculine given names
Danish masculine given names
Finnish masculine given names
Norwegian masculine given names
Swedish masculine given names
Portuguese-language surnames